Diana Ross (born 1944) is an American singer, actress, and record producer.

Diana Ross may also refer to:

 Diana Ross (1970 album)
 Diana Ross (1976 album)
 Diana Ross (author), English children's author